In My Sister's Shadow is a 1999 American made-for-television drama film directed by Sandor Stern and starring Nancy McKeon, Janet Leigh, Thomas Joseph McCarthy and Alexandra Wilson. The film originally aired on CBS on January 5, 1999.

Plot
Joan Connor (Nancy McKeon) is a lonely florist who has always played second fiddle to her pretty younger sister Laurie (Alexandra Wilson) due in part by the well-meaning but misguided signals sent out by their mother Kay (Janet Leigh). When Laurie finally leaves her longtime ex-boyfriend Michael (Thomas Joseph McCarthy) after a roller-coaster relationship, Joan is there again to pick up the pieces. But Laurie doesn't need to be picked up for very long: she meets Mark (Mark Dobies), a handsome man who owns a fish store.

Michael, on the other hand, can't get over the breakup and begins stalking Laurie and her new beau, all the while trying to seduce and insinuate plain Joan into his life — and turn her against her sister. Laurie and Mark decide to get married, which pushes a psychotic Michael over the edge and forces Joan to make some kind of decision.

Cast
Nancy McKeon as Joan Connor
Janet Leigh as Kay Connor
Thomas Joseph McCarthy as Michael Butler
Alexandra Wilson as Laurie Connor
Mark Dobies as Mark
Scott Wilkinson as Detective Charlie Hunt

Filming
In My Sister's Shadow was shot on location in Salt Lake City from March 11 to April 4, 1997. Although the film was completed in 1997, CBS did not premiere it until 1999.

References

External links

1999 films
1999 television films
1999 drama films
CBS network films
Films about stalking
Films shot in Salt Lake City
Films directed by Sandor Stern
Films scored by Dennis McCarthy
American drama television films
1990s American films